The Desert Inn Classic was a golf tournament on the LPGA Tour from 1971 to 1974. It was played at the Desert Inn Country Club in Las Vegas, Nevada.

Winners
Desert Inn Classic
1974 JoAnne Carner

Sealy-Faberge Classic
1973 Kathy Cornelius

Sealy LPGA Classic
1972 Betty Burfeindt
1971 Sandra Palmer

References

Former LPGA Tour events
Golf in Las Vegas
History of women in Nevada
Sports competitions in Las Vegas